Lake Büyükçekmece is a liman formed at the point where the river Karasudere flows into the Marmara Sea. The lake is located south of the Çatalca district, west of Istanbul, Turkey. It is used as a freshwater reservoir.

The lake's bar was reinforced in 1988 by a dam.

The fluvial lake developed as the flow of Karasudere, and as it came downwards from Çatalca it was blocked off and formed by the resulting sandbank it created. A reedy, brackish salt-water lake exists between the Büyükçekmece Dam and the Marmara Sea.

The number of fish species observed in the lake has decreased from 30 in the past to 15 currently.

At the northern shore of the lake, Istanbul Hezarfen Airfield is situated on a peninsula.

Biology and status
The lake, which is not protected, was declared by BirdLife International as an Important Bird Area in 1989 for its numerous distinct and threatened waterfowl species.

See also 
Büyükçekmece
Büyükçekmece Dam
Küçükçekmece
Lake Küçükçekmece

References 

Lagoons of Turkey
Geography of Istanbul
Marmara Region
Büyükçekmece
Important Bird Areas of Turkey
Landforms of Istanbul Province